Wawayanda Creek (pronounced "way way yonda") is the name of Pochuck Creek above its confluence with the tributary Black Creek. Wawayanda Creek, via Pochuck Creek, is a tributary of the Wallkill River in Sussex County, New Jersey in the United States. It starts northeast of Warwick, New York, and runs southwest, mostly within Orange County, flowing into New Jersey for several miles to its confluence with Black Creek just north of Highland Lakes, forming Pochuck Creek, which flows north back into New York.

See also
List of rivers of New Jersey
List of rivers of New York

References

Tributaries of the Wallkill River
Rivers of New Jersey
Rivers of Sussex County, New Jersey
Warwick, New York
Rivers of Orange County, New York
Rivers of New York (state)